Jhon Freddy García Fería (born May 25, 1974 in Buga, Valle del Cauca) is a former professional track and road racing cyclist from Colombia.

Major results

2000
 1st Overall Vuelta al Valle del Cauca
 1st Stage 10 Vuelta a Colombia
 1st Stages 3 & 4 Clásico RCN
2001
 1st Stage 2 Tour du Maroc
2002
 1st  National Road Race Championships
 1st Stage 14 Vuelta a Colombia
2003
 1st Stage 3 Vuelta al Valle del Cauca
2004
 1st Overall Vuelta al Valle del Cauca
 1st Stage 3 Vuelta a Boyacà
 1st Stage 5 Vuelta a Antioquia
 1st Stages 10 & 11 Vuelta a Colombia
2005
 1st Stage 3 Vuelta al Valle del Cauca
 3rd Overall Vuelta a Antioquia
1st Stages 1, 2, 5 & 6
2006
 1st Overall Vuelta al Valle del Cauca, (COL)
 3rd National Road Race Championships
 2nd  Road race, Central American and Caribbean Games
 1st Stages 4 & 10 Vuelta a Colombia
 1st Stage 1 Clásico RCN
 1st Stage 11 Vuelta a Chiriquí
2007
 1st Stage 2 Vuelta al Tolima
 1st Stage 6 Clásico RCN
 2nd Overall Vuelta a Chiriquí
1st Stages 1b, 3 (TTT) & 7
2008
 1st Stage 2 Vuelta a Colombia
 1st Stage 8 Clásico RCN
2009
 1st Stage 1 Vuelta al Valle del Cauca
 1st Stage 5 Vuelta a Antioquia

References
 

1974 births
Living people
Sportspeople from Valle del Cauca Department
Colombian male cyclists
Cyclists at the 1996 Summer Olympics
Cyclists at the 2000 Summer Olympics
Cyclists at the 1999 Pan American Games
Olympic cyclists of Colombia
Vuelta a Colombia stage winners
Pan American Games competitors for Colombia
21st-century Colombian people
Competitors at the 2006 Central American and Caribbean Games